Chris Evert defeated Wendy Turnbull in the final, 6–2, 6–0 to win the women's singles tennis title at the 1979 French Open. It was her third French Open singles title and her ninth major singles title overall.

Virginia Ruzici was the defending champion, but lost in the quarterfinals to Dianne Fromholtz.

Seeds
The seeded players are listed below. Chris Evert is the champion; others show the round in which they were eliminated.

  Chris Evert (champion)
  Virginia Wade (second round)
  Dianne Fromholtz (semifinals)
  Wendy Turnbull (finalist)
  Virginia Ruzici (quarterfinals)
  Sue Barker (second round)
  Regina Maršíková (semifinals)
  Betty Stöve (third round)
  Mima Jaušovec (second round)
  Kathy May-Teacher (second round)
  Rosie Casals (first round)
  Marise Kruger (second round)
  Anne Smith (third round)
  Ilana Kloss (second round)
 n/a
  Marita Redondo (first round)

Draw

Key
 Q = Qualifier
 WC = Wild card
 LL = Lucky loser
 r = Retired

Finals

Earlier rounds

Section 1

Section 2

Section 3

Section 4

References

External links
1979 French Open – Women's draws and results at the International Tennis Federation

Women's Singles
French Open by year – Women's singles
French Open - Women's Singles
1979 in women's tennis
1979 in French women's sport